Kronik is a compilation album released by the Canadian thrash metal/progressive metal band Voivod in 1998 on Hypnotic Records. It is their eleventh release altogether, featuring remixes, previously unreleased songs, and live recordings. The album features the track "Ion", which is played during the opening credits of the Heavy Metal 2000 movie. It was re-released in 2004 by Candlelight Records.

Track listing

Personnel
Voivod
 Eric Forrest - bass guitar, vocals
 Denis D'Amour - guitar
 Michel Langevin - drums, artwork

Production
Daryn Barry, Alfio Annibalini - engineers on tracks 4-6, mixing on tracks 4-6 and 8-11
James Cavalluzzo - mixing on track 7
Eric Poitevin - live recording engineer on tracks 8-11

References

Voivod (band) albums
1998 compilation albums